1957 (MCMLVII) was a common year starting on Tuesday of the Gregorian calendar, the 1957th year of the Common Era (CE) and Anno Domini (AD) designations, the 957th year of the 2nd millennium, the 57th year of the 20th century, and the 8th year of the 1950s decade.

Events

January
 January 1 – The Saarland joins West Germany.
 January 3 – Hamilton Watch Company introduces the first electric watch.
 January 5 – South African player Russell Endean becomes the first batsman to be dismissed for having handled the ball, in Test cricket.
 January 9 – British Prime Minister Anthony Eden resigns.
 January 10 – Harold Macmillan becomes Prime Minister of the United Kingdom.
 January 11 – The African Convention is founded in Dakar.
 January 14 – Kripalu Maharaj is named fifth Jagadguru (world teacher), after giving seven days of speeches before 500 Hindu scholars. 
 January 15 –  The film Throne of Blood, Akira Kurosawa's reworking of Macbeth, is released in Japan.
 January 20
 Dwight D. Eisenhower is privately sworn in for a second term, as President of the United States.
 Israel withdraws from the Sinai Peninsula (captured from Egypt on October 29, 1956).
 January 26 – The Ibirapuera Planetarium (the first in the Southern Hemisphere) is inaugurated in the city of São Paulo, Brazil.

February
 February 2 – President Iskander Mirza of Pakistan lays the foundation-stone of the Guddu Barrage across the Indus River, near Sukkur.
 February 4
 France prohibits U.N. involvement in Algeria.
 The first nuclear-powered submarine, logs its 60,000th nautical mile, matching the endurance of the fictional Nautilus described in Jules Verne's 1870 novel Twenty Thousand Leagues Under the Sea. It is decommissioned on March 3, 1980.
 A coal gas explosion at the giant Bishop Coal Mine in Bishop, Virginia, United States, kills 37 men.
 February 6 – The Soviet Union announces that Swedish envoy Raoul Wallenberg had died in a Soviet prison ("possibly of a heart attack"), on July 17, 1947.
 February 10 – The Confederation of African Football is founded, at a meeting in Khartoum.
 February 15 – Andrei Gromyko becomes foreign minister of the Soviet Union.
 February 16 – Ingmar Bergman's film The Seventh Seal opens at cinemas in Sweden.
 February 17 – A fire at a home for the elderly in Warrenton, Missouri, United States, kills 72 people.
 February 18
 Kenyan rebel leader Dedan Kimathi is executed by the British colonial government.
 The last person to be executed in New Zealand, Walter James Bolton, is hanged at Mount Eden Prison for poisoning his wife.
 February 23 – The founding congress of the Senegalese Popular Bloc opens in Dakar.

March

 March 1
 U Nu becomes Prime Minister of Burma.
 Arturo Lezama becomes President of the National Council of Government of Uruguay.
 Sud Aviation forms, from a merger between SNCASE (Société Nationale de Constructions Aéronautiques du Sud Est) and SNCASO (Société Nationale de Constructions Aéronautiques du Sud Ouest).
 March 3 – Net als toen, sung by Corry Brokken (music by Guus Jansen, lyrics by Willy van Hemert), wins the Eurovision Song Contest 1957 (held at Frankfurt), for the Netherlands.
 March 6
 United Kingdom colonies Gold Coast and British Togoland become the independent nation of Ghana.
 Zodi Ikhia founds the Nigerien Democratic Front (FDN) in Niger.
 March 8 – Egypt re-opens the Suez Canal.
 March 14 – President Sukarno declares martial law in Indonesia.
 March 17 – 1957 Cebu Douglas C-47 crash: Philippine President Ramon Magsaysay and 24 others are killed in a plane crash.
 March 20 – The French news magazine L'Express reveals that the French army tortures Algerian prisoners.
 March 25 – The Treaty of Rome (Patto di Roma) establishes the European Economic Community (EEC; predecessor of the European Union) between Italy, France, West Germany, Belgium, the Netherlands and Luxembourg.
 March 27 – The 29th Academy Awards Ceremony is held in Hollywood. Around the World in 80 Days wins Best Picture.

April
 April – IBM sells the first compiler for the Fortran scientific programming language.
 April 1 – The first new conscripts join the Bundeswehr.
 April 5 – The Communist Party of India wins the elections in Kerala, making E. M. S. Namboodiripad its first chief minister.
 April 9 – Egypt reopens the Suez Canal to all shipping.
 April 12 – The United Kingdom announces that Singapore will gain self-rule on January 1, 1958.
 April 15
 The Distant Early Warning Line is handed over by contractors to the U.S. and Canadian military.
 White Rock secedes from Surrey, British Columbia, following a referendum.
 April 17 – Suspected English serial killer Dr. John Bodkin Adams is found not guilty of murder, at the Old Bailey.
 April 24 – 25 – The 1957 Fethiye earthquakes occur, on the Mediterranean coast of Turkey.
 April 30 – An annular solar eclipse was a non-central annular solar eclipse, that does NOT have a northern path limit. This was the last of 57 umbral solar eclipses of Solar Saros 118.

May
 May 2 – "Die Stem van Suid-Afrika", written by Cornelis Jacobus Langenhoven, becomes the South African national anthem, replacing "God Save the Queen", which is retained as a royal anthem.
 May 8 – South Vietnamese President Ngo Dinh Diem begins a state visit to the United States, his regime's main sponsor.
 May 15.
 Operation Grapple: At Malden Island in the Pacific, Britain tests its first hydrogen bomb, which fails to detonate properly.
 Stanley Matthews plays his final international game, ending an English record international career of almost 23 years.
 May 16 – Paul-Henri Spaak becomes the new Secretary General of NATO.
 May 24 – May 24 incident: Anti-American riots erupt in Taipei, Taiwan.
 May 30 – Real Madrid beats Fiorentina 2–0 at Santiago Bernabéu Stadium, Madrid, to win the 1956–57 European Cup (football).

June
 June 9 – Broad Peak, on the China-Pakistan border, is first ascended.
 June 21 – John Diefenbaker becomes the 13th Prime Minister of Canada.
 June 27 – Hurricane Audrey demolishes Cameron, Louisiana, U.S., killing 400 people.

July
 
 July 1
 The International Geophysical Year begins.
 The University of Waterloo is founded in Waterloo, Ontario, Canada.
 Hugh Everett III publishes the first scientifically founded many-worlds interpretation of quantum mechanics.
 Production of the Citroën Traction Avant automobile, begun in 1934, ceases.
 July 6 - At the age of fifteen, Paul McCartney meets John Lennon and his band, the Quarrymen, at the St Peter's Church Hall fête in Woolton.
 July 11 – His Highness Prince Karim Aga Khan IV becomes the 49th Imam of the Shia Ismaili Muslims at age 20. His grandfather Sir Sultan Mohammed Shah Aga Khan III appoints Prince Karim in his will.
 July 14 – Rawya Ateya takes her seat in the National Assembly of Egypt, thereby becoming the first female parliamentarian in the Arab world.
 July 16 – United States Marine Major John Glenn flies an F8U supersonic jet from California to New York in 3 hours, 23 minutes and 8 seconds, setting a new transcontinental speed record.
 July 19 – The largely autobiographical novel The Ordeal of Gilbert Pinfold by Evelyn Waugh is published.
 July 25 – Tunisia becomes a republic, with Habib Bourguiba as its first president.
 July 28
 The 6th World Festival of Youth and Students, a high point of the Khrushchev Thaw, opens in Moscow.
 Heavy rains and mudslides at Isahaya, western Kyūshū, Japan, kill 992.
 July 29 – The International Atomic Energy Agency is established.

August
 August 4 – Juan Manuel Fangio, driving for Maserati, wins the Formula One German Grand Prix, clinching (with 4 wins this season) his record 5th world drivers championship, including his 4th consecutive championship (also a record); these 2 records endure for nearly half a century.
 August 31 – The Federation of Malaya gains independence from the United Kingdom, subsequently celebrated as Malaysia's National Day. Abdul Rahman of Negeri Sembilan, Yang di-Pertuan Besar of Negeri Sembilan, becomes the first Yang di-Pertuan Agong of Malaya. The country's new Constitution had come into force on August 27. The Alliance Party and its successor are the ruling coalition until 2018.

September
 
 September 9 – The Civil Rights Act of 1957 is enacted, establishing the United States Commission on Civil Rights.
 September 21
 Olav V becomes King of Norway, on the death of his father Haakon VII.
 The sailing ship Pamir sinks off the Azores, in a hurricane.
 September 24 – Camp Nou, home-stadium of FC Barcelona, officially opens in Barcelona, Spain.
 September 29 – The Kyshtym disaster occurs, at the Mayak nuclear reprocessing plant in Russia.

October

 October 1 – The Africanized bee is accidentally released in Brazil.
 October 4
 Space Age – Sputnik program: The Soviet Union launches Sputnik 1, the first artificial satellite to orbit the earth.
 The Avro Canada CF-105 Arrow delta wing interceptor aircraft is unveiled.
 October 10 – Windscale fire: Fire at the Windscale nuclear reactor on the north-west coast of England releases radioactive material into the surrounding environment, including iodine-131.
 October 11
 The Jodrell Bank radio telescope opens in Cheshire, England. 
 The orbit of the last stage of the R-7 Semyorka rocket (carrying Sputnik I) is first successfully calculated on an IBM 704 computer at the MIT Computation Center as part of Operation Moonwatch, Cambridge, Massachusetts.
 October 21 – Two trains collide at Yarımburgaz in Turkey; 95 die.
 October 23 – Morocco begins its invasion of Ifni.
 October 27 – Celâl Bayar is re-elected president of Turkey.

November
 
 November 1 – The Mackinac Bridge, the world's longest suspension bridge between anchorages at this time, opens in the United States, to connect Michigan's two peninsulas.
 November 3 – Sputnik program: The Soviet Union launches Sputnik 2, with the first animal to orbit the Earth (a dog named Laika) on board; there is no technology available to return it to Earth.
 November 13
 Gordon Gould invents the laser.
 Flooding in the Po Valley of Italy leads to flooding also in Venice.
 November 15
 1957 Aquila Airways Solent crash: A flying boat crash on the Isle of Wight leaves 45 dead.
 Yugoslavia announces the end of an economic boycott of Francoist Spain (although it does not reinstitute diplomatic relations).
 November 16 – Adnan Menderes of the Democrat Party forms the new government of Turkey (23rd government, last government formed by DP and Menderes).
 November 30 
 Indonesian president Sukarno survives a grenade attack at the Cikini School in Jakarta, but six children are killed.
 1957 New Zealand general election: The Labour Party defeats the governing National Party, with Walter Nash succeeding Keith Holyoake as Prime Minister.

December
 December 1 – In Indonesia, Sukarno announces the nationalization of 246 Dutch businesses.
 December 4 – The Lewisham rail crash in London, UK, leaves 92 people dead.
 December 5 – All 326,000 Dutch nationals are expelled from Indonesia.
 December 6 – The first U.S. attempt to launch a satellite fails, when the Vanguard rocket blows up on the launch pad.
 December 10 – Canadian diplomat Lester B. Pearson receives the Nobel Peace Prize, for his peacekeeping efforts in the United Nations.
 December 20 – The Boeing 707 airliner flies for the first time.

Date unknown 
 Mao Zedong admits that 800,000 "class enemies" had been summarily liquidated in China between 1949 and 1954.
 Gruppe SPUR, an artistic collaboration, is founded in Germany. 
 Raja Fashions, a tailoring business, is founded in Hong Kong.
 The so-called 'mound of Midas', the Great Tumulus near Gordium, is excavated.
 Three new neo-grotesque sans-serif typefaces are released: Folio (designed by Konrad Bauer and Walter Baum), Neue Haas Grotesk (designed by Max Miedinger) and Univers (designed by Adrian Frutiger); all will be influential in the International Typographic Style of graphic design.

Births

January 

 January 1 
 Isabel Ordaz, Spanish actress
 Ewa Kasprzyk, Polish actress
 January 3 – Bojan Križaj, Slovenian alpine skier
 January 4 – Patty Loveless, American country music singer
 January 5 – Maartin Allcock, English multi-instrumentalist and record producer (d. 2018)
 January 6 – Nancy Lopez, American golfer
 January 7
 Katie Couric, American television host
 Hannu Kamppuri, Finnish ice hockey goaltender
 Julian Solís, Puerto Rican former world bantamweight champion boxer
 January 8
 David Lang, American composer
 Dwight Clark, American football player (d. 2018)
 January 9 – Bibie, Ghanaian singer
 January 11 
 Bryan Robson, English footballer
 Claude Criquielion, Belgian bike racer (d. 2015)
 January 12 – John Lasseter, American director, writer and animator
 January 13
 Lorrie Moore, American writer
 Daniel Scioli, Argentine politician and sportsman
 January 14
 Anchee Min, Chinese writer
 Wu Chengzhen, Chinese Buddhist abbess
 January 15 – Mario Van Peebles, African-American actor and director
 January 16 – Ricardo Darín, Argentinian actor
 January 17 – Steve Harvey, African-American comedian, television host, radio personality and actor
 January 22
 Mike Bossy, Canadian hockey player (d. 2022)
 Rene Requiestas, Filipino comedian (d. 1993)
 Godfrey Thoma, Nauruan politician
 January 23 – Caroline, Princess of Hanover
 January 26 – Road Warrior Hawk, American professional wrestler (d. 2003)
 January 27
 Frank Miller, American comic book writer
 Janick Gers, British heavy metal guitarist
January 29 – Grażyna Miller, Polish poet
 January 30 – Payne Stewart, American golfer (d. 1999)

February 

 February 1 – Dennis Brown, Jamaican reggae singer (d. 1999)
 February 2 – Phil Barney, French singer
 February 5 – Jackie Woodburne, Australian actress
 February 6 
 Kathy Najimy, American actress and comedian
 Robert Townsend, African-American actor, comedian, director, and writer (Hollywood Shuffle) 
 February 8 – Cindy Wilson, American rock singer (The B-52's)
 February 9 – Gordon Strachan, Scottish footballer and manager
 February 11 – Mitchell Symons, British writer
 February 14 – Soile Isokoski, Finnish lyric soprano
 February 15 
 Nathaniel Bar-Jonah, American criminal (d. 2008)
 Shahriar Mandanipour, Iranian writer
 February 16 – LeVar Burton, African-American actor
 February 17 – Loreena McKennitt, Canadian singer, composer, harpist (Mummers' Dance)
 February 18
 Marita Koch, German athlete
 Vanna White, American game show presenter (Wheel of Fortune)
 February 19 
 Falco, Austrian rock musician (Rock Me Amadeus) (d. 1998)
 Ray Winstone, British actor
 February 20 – Glen Hanlon, Canadian ice hockey coach
 February 23 – Ria Brieffies, Dutch singer (d. 2009)
 February 25 – Tharman Shanmugaratnam, Singaporean politician, 5th Senior Minister of Singapore
 February 27
 Danny Antonucci, Canadian creator of the Cartoon Network show Ed, Edd n Eddy
 Ralph Cox, American professional ice hockey player
 Timothy Spall, English actor
 February 28 
 Ian Smith, New Zealand cricketer
 John Turturro, American actor, writer and director

March

 March 4 – Mykelti Williamson, American actor
 March 5 – Mark E. Smith, English singer (d. 2018)
 March 6 – Eddie Deezen, American actor, voice actor and comedian
 March 8 – Clive Burr, British heavy metal drummer (d. 2013)
 March 9 – Mona Sahlin, Swedish politician
 March 10 
 Matt Knudsen, American actor, comedian and writer
 Osama bin Laden, Saudi-born founder of al-Qaeda (d. 2011)
 Hans-Peter Friedrich, German politician
 March 11 – Qasem Soleimani, Iranian general (d. 2020)
 March 12 
 Val Demings, American politician
 Marlon Jackson, African-American singer
 March 13 – David Peaston, American singer (d. 2012)
 March 15
 Joaquim de Almeida, Portuguese actor
 Park Overall, American film and television actress
 March 18 – György Pazdera, Hungarian rock bassist (Pokolgép)
 March 19 – Christopher Murray, American actor
 March 20
 Vanessa Bell Calloway, African-American actress
 John Grogan, American journalist and non-fiction writer 
 Spike Lee, African-American film director and actor
 Theresa Russell, American actress
 March 23 
 Edna Molewa, South African politician (d. 2018)
 Teresa Ganzel, American comedian and actress
 Lucio Gutiérrez, 41st President of Ecuador
 Robbie James, Welsh footballer
 Amanda Plummer, American actress
 March 24 – Jack Edwards, American play-by-play announcer
 March 26 – Leeza Gibbons, American television personality
 March 27 – Stephen Dillane, English actor
 March 28 – Paul Eiding, American actor and voice actor
 March 29 – Christopher Lambert, French-American actor
 March 30
 Shen Yi-ming, Taiwanese Air Force general officer (d. 2020) 
 Paul Reiser, American comedian and actor
 Ian Shelton,  Canadian astronomer who discovered SN 1987A
 March 31 
 Marc McClure, American actor
 Terry Klassen, Canadian voice actor and voice director

April

 April 1
 J. Karjalainen, Finnish rock musician
 Denise Nickerson, American actress (d. 2019)
 April 2
 Mark Alburger, American composer 
 Giuliana De Sio, Italian actress
 April 4
 Joaquín "El Chapo" Guzmán, Mexican drug lord
 Aki Kaurismäki, Finnish film director
 April 5 – Ivan Corea, Sri Lankan autism campaigner
 April 8 – Henry Cluney, Irish musician
 April 9 – Seve Ballesteros, Spanish golfer (d. 2011)
 April 10 – Ülle Kaljuste, Estonian actress 
 April 12 – Vince Gill, American singer and songwriter
 April 14 – Mikhail Pletnev, Russian pianist, conductor and composer
 April 17
 Afrika Bambaataa, American DJ and producer
 Susan Roman, Canadian voice actress
 April 18 – Genie, American feral child
 April 20 - Aviva Chomsky, history professor and coordinator of Latin American studies at Salem State University
 April 21
 Jesse Orosco, American baseball player
 Herbert Wetterauer, German artist and author
 Faustin-Archange Touadéra, 8th President of the Central African Republic
 April 22 – Donald Tusk, Prime Minister of Poland
 April 23
 Jan Hooks, American actress and comedian (d. 2014)
 Kenji Kawai, Japanese composer
 April 24 – Nazir Ahmed, Baron Ahmed, Pakistani-British Labour Party politician
 April 25
 Eric Bristow, English darts player (d. 2018)
 Roch Marc Christian Kaboré, 7th Prime Minister and 8th President of Burkina Faso
 April 27 – Michel Barrette, Canadian actor and stand-up comedian
 April 28 – Dinorah de Jesús Rodriguez, Cuban-born experimental filmmaker
 April 29
 Daniel Day-Lewis, English-born actor
 Timothy Treadwell, American environmentalist and filmmaker (d. 2003)

May

 May 1 – Jo Jorgensen, American libertarian politician and academic
 May 3 – Jo Brand, English comedian
 May 5 – Richard E. Grant, English actor
 May 10 – Sid Vicious (John Beverley), English punk rock bassist (Sex Pistols) (d. 1979)
 May 11 – Peter North, Canadian adult actor
 May 13 – Carrie Lam, Hong Kong civil servant
 May 14 – Daniela Dessì, Italian operatic soprano (d. 2016)
 May 15
 Kevin Von Erich, American professional wrestler
 Juan José Ibarretxe, Basque Lehendakari (Prime Minister)
 May 16
 Joan Benoit, American Olympic gold medal-winning marathon runner
 Bob Suter, American professional ice hockey player (d. 2014)
 May 17 – Gösta Sundqvist, Finnish rock singer and songwriter (Leevi and the Leavings) (d. 2003)
 May 18 
 Michael Cretu, Romanian–German new-age musician (Enigma)
 Frank Plasberg, German journalist and television presenter
 May 20 – Yoshihiko Noda, 62nd Prime Minister of Japan
 May 21
 Nadine Dorries, British politician
 Rebecca Jones, Mexican actress
 Judge Reinhold, American actor
 Renée Soutendijk, Dutch actress
 May 22
 Albert Boonstra, Dutch swimmer
 Shinji Morisue, Japanese gymnast
 Gary Sweet, Australian actor
 May 23 – Jimmy McShane (aka Baltimora), Northern Irish singer and dancer (d. 1995)
 May 24
 John Harrington, American professional ice hockey player
 Walter Moers, German comic artist and writer
 John G. Rowland, American Republican politician, Governor of Connecticut and felon
 May 26 
François Legault, Canadian politician, Premier of Quebec
Pontso Sekatle, Lesotho academic and politician
Dan Roodt, South African author and politician 
 May 27 – Siouxsie Sioux, born Susan Ballion, English post-punk singer (Siouxsie and the Banshees)
 May 28 – Kirk Gibson, American baseball player
 May 29 – Ted Levine, American actor
 May 31 – Jim Craig, American professional ice hockey player

June

 June 1 – Dorota Kędzierzawska, Polish film director
 June 3 – Horst-Ulrich Hänel, German field hockey player
 June 5 – Kim Tai-chung, Korean martial artist and former actor and Bruce Lee double (d. 2011)
 June 7 – Juan Luis Guerra, Dominican singer and songwriter
 June 8
 Scott Adams, American cartoonist (Dilbert)
 Dimple Kapadia, Indian actress
 June 12
 Timothy Busfield, American actor
 Gamal Al-Ghandour, Egyptian football referee
 Javed Miandad, Pakistani cricketer
 Tarek Shawki, Egyptian academic, 25th Minister of Education and Technical Education in Egypt
June 14 – Maxi Jazz, British musician, rapper, singer-songwriter and DJ (d. 2022)
 June 15 – Seppo Pääkkönen, Finnish actor
 June 19 – Anna Lindh, Swedish politician (d. 2003)
 June 21 
 Michael Bowen, American actor
 Luis Antonio Tagle, Filipino cardinal, Archbishop of Manila
 June 23 – Frances McDormand, American actress
 June 25 – William Goh, Archbishop of Singapore
 June 27 – Erik Hamrén, Swedish football player
 June 28
 Lance Nethery, Canadian ice hockey player
 Georgi Parvanov, President of Bulgaria
 June 29 – Gurbanguly Berdimuhamedow, Turkmen politician, 2nd President of Turkmenistan
 June 30 – Silvio Orlando, Italian actor

July

 July 1 
 Erdeniin Bat-Üül, Mongolian politician
 Hannu Kamppuri, Finnish ice hockey player
 July 2 – Bret Hart, Canadian professional wrestler
 July 3
 Shan Goshorn, American Cherokee artist (d. 2018)
 Ken Ober, American actor and game show host (d. 2009)
 July 4 
 Princess Chulabhorn of Thailand
 Jenny Seagrove, English actress
 M. Nasir, Singaporean-Malaysian poet, singer-songwriter, composer, producer, actor and film director
 Dmitry Nazarov, Soviet-Russian actor
 July 5 – Doug Wilson, Canadian ice hockey
 July 6 – Chong Eng, Malaysian politician
 July 7 – Mohd Puad Zarkashi, Malaysian politician
 July 9
 Paul Merton, English writer, actor, comedian, radio and television presenter
 Marc Almond, English singer
 Kelly McGillis, American actress
 July 10 – Cindy Sheehan, American anti-war activist
 July 11 - Peter Murphy, English rock singer (Bauhaus), songwriter and musician. 
 July 12 
 Götz Alsmann, German television presenter, musician and singer
 Pino Quartullo, Italian actor, director, screenwriter and playwright
 Rick Husband, American astronaut (d. 2003)
 July 13
 Lília Cabral, Brazilian actress
 Tony Vega, Puerto Rican singer
 Cameron Crowe, American writer and film director
 July 17 – Shinobu Otake, Japanese actress
 July 18 – Nick Faldo, British golfer
 July 21
 Jon Lovitz, American actor and comedian
 Stefan Löfven, 33rd Prime Minister of Sweden
 July 23 – Theo van Gogh, Dutch film director (d. 2004)
 July 24 – Shavkat Mirziyoyev, Uzbek politician, 3rd Prime Minister of Uzbekistan and 2nd President of Uzbekistan
 July 26
 Yuen Biao, Hong Kong actor
 Nana Visitor, American actress
 July 27 – Hansi Müller, German footballer
 July 29
 Nellie Kim, Russian gymnast
 Fumio Kishida, 100th Prime Minister of Japan

August

 August 2 – Lo' Lo' Mohd Ghazali, Malaysian politician (d. 2011)
 August 4
 Rupert Farley, British actor and voice actor
 John Wark, Scottish footballer
 August 6 – Jim McGreevey, 52nd Governor of New Jersey
 August 7 – Alexander Dityatin, Soviet gymnast
 August 9 – Melanie Griffith, American actress
 August 10 – Juli Básti, Hungarian actress
 August 11 – Richie Ramone, American rock drummer (Ramones)
 August 14 – Peter Costello, Australian politician
 August 15 – Željko Ivanek, Slovenian-American actor
 August 16
 Tim Farriss, Australian rock guitarist (INXS)
 Laura Innes, American actress and director 
 Phil Murphy, American politician
 August 17 – Robin Cousins, British figure skater
 August 18
 Carole Bouquet, French actress
 Denis Leary, American comedian and actor
 Harald Schmidt, German actor, writer, columnist, comedian and television entertainer
 August 19 – Li-Young Lee, Indonesian-born poet
 August 20 – Finlay Calder, Scottish rugby player
 August 22 – Steve Davis, British snooker player
 August 24 – Stephen Fry, British comedian, author and actor
 August 25 – Simon McBurney, British actor, writer and theatre director
 August 26
 Dr. Alban, Nigerian-born Swedish singer
 Uzo, Nigerian-American film producer and director
 August 27 – Bernhard Langer, German golfer
 August 28
 Ivo Josipović, President of Croatia
 Rick Rossovich, American actor
 Daniel Stern, American actor
 Ai Weiwei, Chinese artist, philosopher
 August 29
 Grzegorz Ciechowski, Polish musician (d. 2001)
 Shirō Sagisu, Japanese composer
 August 30 – Manu Tuiasosopo, American football player
 August 31 
 Gina Schock, American drummer (The Go-Go's)
 Ingrid Washinawatok, Native American activist (d. 1999)

September

 September 1 – Gloria Estefan, Cuban-born American singer
 September 6 – José Sócrates, 117th Prime Minister of Portugal
 September 7
 Ewa Kasprzyk, Polish athlete
 John McInerney, British-German singer-songwriter (Bad Boys Blue)
 September 8 – Ricardo Montaner, Argentine-born Venezuelan singer
 September 11 – Preben Elkjær, Danish footballer
 September 12
 Jan Egeland, Norwegian politician, diplomat and humanitarian
 Kadim Al Sahir, Iraqi singer
 Rachel Ward, English-born actress
 Hans Zimmer, German composer
 September 13
 Bongbong Marcos, 17th President of the Philippines
 Cesare Bocci, Italian actor
 Mal Donaghy, Northern Irish footballer
 September 16 – David McCreery, Irish footballer
 September 18 – Mark Wells, American professional ice hockey player
 September 19
 Chris Roupas, Greek-American basketball player
 Mark Acheson, Canadian film, television and voice actor
 September 20 – Sabine Christiansen, German journalist and television presenter
 September 21
 Ethan Coen, American film director, producer, screenwriter and editor
 Kevin Rudd, 26th Prime Minister of Australia
 September 22 
 Nick Cave, Australian musician, songwriter, author, screenwriter and actor
 Mark Johnson, American professional ice hockey player and coach
 Dalia Reyes Barrios, Venezuelan art collector
 September 25 – Michael Madsen, American actor
 September 26 – Luigi De Canio, Italian footballer and football manager
 September 27 – Peter Sellars, American theatre director
 September 28 – Luis Cluzeau Mortet, Uruguayan composer and musician
 September 29 – Andrew Dice Clay, American comedian
 September 30 – Fran Drescher, American actress

October

 October 4 
Bill Fagerbakke, American actor
Aleksandr Tkachyov, Soviet gymnast
 October 5 – Bernie Mac, African-American stand-up comedian and actor (d. 2008)
 October 7 – Jayne Torvill, British ice dancer and Olympian 
 October 8
 Ewan Stewart, Scottish actor
 Magdalena Cajías, Bolivian academic, historian, and politician.
 October 9 – Herman Brusselmans, Belgian novelist, poet, playwright and columnist
 October 10 – Rumiko Takahashi, Japanese manga artist
 October 11
 Dawn French, British comedian 
 Eric Keenleyside, Canadian actor
 October 12 – Clémentine Célarié, French actress
 October 15 
 Mira Nair, Indian born-American film maker
 Stacy Peralta, American director and skateboarder
 October 20 – Manuel Huerga, Spanish film director and screenwriter
 October 21
 Steve Lukather, American guitarist, singer, songwriter, arranger and record producer
 Wolfgang Ketterle, German physicist, Nobel Prize laureate
 October 22 – Daniel Melingo, Argentine musician
 October 23 – Paul Kagame, 4th President of Rwanda
 October 25 – Nancy Cartwright, American voice actress (Bart Simpson from 'The Simpsons') 
 October 26 
 Bob Golic, American football player
 Julie Dawn Cole, English actress
 October 27 
 Jeff East, American actor
 Tsai Ming-liang, Taiwanese film director
 October 28 
 Ahmet Kaya, Turkish folk singer (d.2000)
 Stephen Morris, British drummer
 October 29 – Dan Castellaneta, American voice actor (Homer Simpson from 'The Simpsons')
 October 30
 Kevin Pollak, American actor
 Richard Jeni, American stand-up comedian and actor (d. 2007)
 October 31
 Brian Stokes Mitchell, American actor and singer
 Robert Pollard, American musician
 Shirley Phelps-Roper, American political and religious activist

November

 November 3 – Dolph Lundgren, Swedish actor and martial artist
 November 4 – Tony Abbott, 28th Prime Minister of Australia
 November 5 – Jon-Erik Hexum, American actor (d. 1984)
 November 6
 Cam Clarke, American voice actor and singer
 Ciro Gomes, Brazilian lawyer and politician
 Klaus Kleinfeld, German business executive
 Lori Singer, American actress and musician
 November 7 – Christopher Knight, American actor 
 November 10 – George Lowe, American voice actor and comedian 
 November 11 
 Ana Pastor, Spanish politician
 Vince DiCola, American composer
 November 12 – Cécilia Attias, wife of French Prime Minister Nicolas Sarkozy
 November 13 
 Greg Abbott, American attorney and politician
 Roger Ingram, American jazz musician, author, educator, trumpet designer
 November 14 – Gregg Burge, American tap dancer and choreographer (d. 1998)
 November 15 – Kevin Eubanks, American jazz guitarist
 November 18 – Olivia Heussler, Swiss photojournalist
 November 19 
 Ofra Haza, Israeli singer (d. 2000)
 Tom Virtue, American actor
 November 20
 John Eriksen, Danish footballer (d. 2002)
 Goodluck Jonathan, 14th President of Nigeria
 Stefan Bellof, German racing driver (d. 1985)
 November 21 – Sophie Lorain, Canadian actress, director and producer
 November 22
 Don Newman, American basketball coach and player (d. 2018)
 Alan Stern, principal investigator of NASA's New Horizons mission to Pluto
 November 23 – William Kaelin Jr., American cellular biologist, Nobel Prize laureate
 November 24 – Denise Crosby, American screen actress
 November 26
 Kevin Kamenetz, American politician (d. 2018)
 Matthias Reim, German singer-songwriter
 November 27 
 Kenny Acheson, Irish race car driver
 Edda Heiðrún Backman, Icelandic actress, singer, director and artist (d. 2016)
 Caroline Kennedy, American author, attorney and daughter of 35th President John F. Kennedy
 November 30 – Colin Mochrie, Scottish-born Canadian comedian

December

 December 1
 Tjahjo Kumolo, Indonesian politician (d. 2022)
 Deep Roy, Anglo-Indian actor, stuntman, puppeteer, and comedian
 Vesta Williams, American singer-songwriter (d. 2011)
 December 3 – Maxim Korobov, Russian businessman and politician 
 December 4 – Eric S. Raymond, American open source software advocate
 December 6
 Thomas Brinkman, American politician
 Andrew Cuomo, American politician
December 7 – Tijjani Muhammad-Bande, Nigerian career-diplomat, President of the United Nations General Assembly (2019)
 December 9
 Peter O'Mara, Australian jazz guitarist and composer
 Donny Osmond, American singer and actor (The Osmonds)
 José Luis Gil, Spanish actor and voice actor
 December 10
 Michael Clarke Duncan, American actor (d. 2012)
 José Mário Vaz, former President of Guinea-Bissau
 Paul Hardcastle, English musician
 December 12 – Sheila E., American percussionist, singer, author, and actress 
 December 13 – Steve Buscemi, American actor
 December 15 – Laura Molina, American artist, musician and actress
 December 16 – Nikolaos Michaloliakos, Greek politician, founder and leader of Golden Dawn, a neo-nazi party
 December 17 – Doug Parker, Canadian voice actor and voice director
 December 19
 Tracy Pew, Australian musician (d. 1986)
 Kevin McHale, American basketball player
 December 20
 Billy Bragg, British singer
 Joyce Hyser, American actress
 Anna Vissi, Greek singer
 December 21
 Tom Henke, American baseball player
 Ray Romano, American actor and comedian
 December 24 – Hamid Karzai, President of Afghanistan
 December 25 – Shane MacGowan, Irish singer and songwriter (The Pogues)
 December 30
 Matt Lauer, American newscaster
 Joanna Pacuła, Polish actress

Date unknown 
Emily Alemika, Nigerian Professor of Law
Genie, American feral child
Marie Mendras, political scientist

Deaths

January

 January 4 – Theodor Körner, Austrian statesman, 5th President of Austria (b. 1873)
 January 10 – Gabriela Mistral, Chilean writer, Nobel Prize laureate (b. 1889)
 January 13 – A. E. Coppard, English short story writer and poet (b. 1878)
 January 14 – Humphrey Bogart, American actor  (b. 1899)
 January 16 
 Alexander Cambridge, 1st Earl of Athlone, English army officer and colonial administrator (b. 1874)
 Arturo Toscanini, Italian conductor (b. 1867)
 January 20 – James Brendan Connolly, American Olympic athlete (b. 1868)
 January 26
 Helene Costello, American actress (b. 1906)
 William Eythe, American actor (b. 1918)
 José Linhares, Brazilian lawyer, 15th President of Brazil (b. 1886)
Mamoru Shigemitsu, Japanese diplomat and politician (b. 1887)

February 

 February 1 – Friedrich Paulus, German field marshal (b. 1890)
 February 2 – Julia Morgan, American architect (b. 1872)
 February 4 – Miguel Covarrubias, Mexican painter (b. 1904)
 February 8
 Walther Bothe, German physicist, Nobel Prize laureate (b. 1891)
 John von Neumann, Hungarian-born mathematician (b. 1903)
 February 9 – Miklós Horthy, Austro-Hungarian admiral and regent of the Kingdom of Hungary (b. 1868)
 February 10 – Laura Ingalls Wilder, American author (b. 1867)
 February 16 
 Josef Hofmann, Polish-born pianist and composer (b. 1876)
 Sir John Townsend, Irish mathematical physicist (b. 1868)
 February 18
 Walter James Bolton, uxoricide, last person to be executed in New Zealand (b. 1888)
 Dedan Kimathi, Kenyan rebel leader, executed (b. 1920)
 Henry Norris Russell, American astronomer (b. 1877)
 February 19 – Märta Torén, Swedish actress (b. 1925)
 February 20 –  Sadri Maksudi Arsal, Turkish politician and academic (b. 1878)
 February 23 – Marika Ninou, Greek singer (b. 1922)
 February 25 – Bugs Moran, American gangster (b. 1893)
 February 27 – Wiljo Tuompo, Finnish general (b. 1893)

March 

 March 5 – William Cameron Menzies, American film production designer (b. 1896)
 March 6 – Sir Alexander Godley, British general (b. 1867)
 March 7 – Wyndham Lewis, English painter (b. 1882)
 March 8 
 János Esterházy, Hungarian politician in Czechoslovakia (b. 1901)
 Othmar Schoeck, Swiss composer (b. 1886)
 March 11 – Richard E. Byrd, American explorer (b. 1888)
 March 12 – Josephine Hull, American actress (b. 1877)
 March 14 – Eugenio Castellotti, Italian racing driver (car crash) (b. 1930)
 March 16 – Constantin Brâncuși, Romanian sculptor (b. 1876)
 March 17
 Seale Harris, American physician (b. 1870)
 Ramon Magsaysay, 7th President of the Philippines (killed in plane crash) (b. 1907)
 March 26
 Édouard Herriot, French politician, 66th Prime Minister of France (b. 1872)
 Max Ophüls, German film director and writer (b. 1902)
 March 28 – Gheorghe Tătărescu, Romanian politician, 36th Prime Minister of Romania (b. 1886)
 March 29 
 Joyce Cary, Irish author (b. 1888)
 María Josefa Segovia Morón, Spanish Roman Catholic laywoman and venerable (b. 1891)
 March 31 – Gene Lockhart, Canadian actor (b. 1891)

April 

 April 3 – Ned Sparks, Canadian character actor (b. 1883)
 April 4 – E. Herbert Norman, Canadian diplomat (b. 1909)
 April 5 – Alagappa Chettiar, Indian philanthropist (b. 1909)
 April 6 – Pierina Morosini, Italian Roman Catholic laywoman, martyr and blessed (b. 1931)
 April 8 
 Dorothy Sebastian, American actress (b. 1903)
 Pedro Segura y Sáenz, Spanish Roman Catholic archbishop (b. 1880)
 April 11 – William Skelly, American oil magnate (b. 1878)
 April 15 – Pedro Infante, Mexican actor and singer (b. 1917)
 April 16 – Johnny Torrio, Italian-born American gangster (b. 1882)
 April 21 – Boris Kozo-Polyansky, Soviet botanist and evolutionary biologist (b. 1890)
 April 23 – Roy Campbell, South African poet (b. 1901)
 April 24 – Elizabeth Hesselblad, Swedish nurse and Roman Catholic saint (b. 1870)
 April 25 – Abdullah bin Jassim Al Thani, Emir of Qatar (b. 1880)
 April 26 – Elinor Fair, American actress (b. 1903)

May 

 May 1 
 Grant Mitchell, American actor (b. 1874)
 Sir George Paish, English economist (b. 1867)
 May 2 – Joseph McCarthy, American senator (b. 1908)
 May 4 – Katie Johnson, British actress (b. 1878)
 May 7
 Wilhelm Filchner, German explorer (b. 1877)
 Zenón Noriega Agüero, Peruvian general, interim President of Peru (b. 1900)
 May 9
 Ezio Pinza, Italian bass (b. 1892)
 Heinrich Campendonk, German-Dutch painter and graphic designer (b. 1889)
 May 12 – Erich von Stroheim, Austrian actor and director (b. 1885)
 May 13
 Michael Fekete, Hungarian-born Israeli mathematician (b. 1886)
 Prince Makonnen, Ethiopian prince (b. 1923)
 Robert Alfred Theobald, American admiral (b. 1884)
 May 14 – Marie Vassilieff, Soviet artist (b. 1884)
 May 16
 John Brown, British actor (b. 1904)
 Eliot Ness, American Prohibition agent (b. 1903)
 May 17 – Francesco Balilla Pratella, Italian composer (b. 1880)
 May 20 – Gilbert Murray, Australian-British classical scholar and intellectual (b. 1866)
 May 29 – James Whale, English film director (b. 1889)
 May 31 – Leopold Staff, Polish poet (b. 1878)

June

 June 1
 Feliksas Baltušis-Žemaitis, Lithuanian military leader (b. 1897)
 Luisa Casati, Italian patron of the arts (b. 1881)
 June 6 – Kulyash Baiseitova, Soviet composer (b. 1912)
 June 12
 Robert Alton, American dancer and choreographer (b. 1906)
 Mario Urteaga Alvarado, Peruvian painter (b. 1875)
 Jimmy Dorsey, American jazz musician (b. 1904)
 June 13 – Irving Baxter, American athlete (b. 1876)
 June 14 – María Beatriz del Rosario Arroyo, Filipino Roman Catholic nun and servant of God (b. 1884)
 June 15 – Princess Norina Matchabelli, Italian perfumier (b. 1880)
 June 17
 Dorothy Richardson, English feminist writer (b. 1873)
 Augusto Samuel Boyd, 20th President of Panama (b. 1879)
 June 18 – Henry H. Goddard, American psychologist and eugenicist (b. 1866)
 June 21 – Johannes Stark, German physicist, Nobel Prize laureate (b. 1874)
 June 23 – Patriarch Ignatius Aphrem I Barsoum (b. 1887)
 June 24 – František Kupka, Czech painter and graphic artist (b. 1871)
 June 26
 Alfred Döblin, German writer (b. 1878)
 Malcolm Lowry, English poet and novelist (b. 1909)
 June 27
 Hermann Buhl, Austrian mountaineer (b. 1924)
 David Wallin, Swedish artist (b. 1876)

July

 July 3 
 Richard Mohaupt, German composer and Kapellmeister (b. 1904)
 Judy Tyler, American actress (b. 1932)
 July 4 – Maria Crocifissa Curcio, Italian Roman Catholic and Carmelite nun (b. 1877)
 July 8 – Grace Coolidge, First Lady of the United States (b. 1879)
 July 10 – Sholem Asch, Polish-Jewish novelist, dramatist and essayist (b. 1880)
 July 11 – Aga Khan III, 48th Nizari Imam (b. 1877)
 July 15
 George Cleveland, Canadian actor (b. 1885)
 James M. Cox, Democratic candidate for President of the United States in the election of 1920 (b. 1870)
 Vasily Maklakov, Russian liberal politician and parliamentary orator (b. 1869)
 July 23 – Giuseppe Tomasi di Lampedusa, Sicilian writer (b. 1896)
 July 24
 Metodija Andonov-Čento, Macedonian statesman (b. 1902)
 Sacha Guitry, Russian-born French playwright, actor and director (b. 1885)
 July 26 – Carlos Castillo Armas, Guatemalan military officer and politician, 28th President of Guatemala (assassinated) (b. 1914)
 July 28 – Edith Abbott, American social worker, educator and author (b. 1876)

August

 August 3 – Devdas Gandhi, youngest son of Mahatma Gandhi (b. 1900)
 August 4 – Washington Luís, 13th President of Brazil (b. 1869)
 August 5 – Heinrich Otto Wieland, German chemist, Nobel Prize laureate (b. 1877)
 August 7 – Oliver Hardy, American actor (b. 1892)
 August 11 – Rudolf Weigl, Polish biologist (b. 1883)
 August 16 – Irving Langmuir, American chemist, Nobel Prize laureate (b. 1881)
 August 19 – David Bomberg, British Vorticist painter (b. 1890)
 August 20 – Julio Lozano Díaz, President of Honduras (b. 1885)
 August 30 – Harold Gatty, Australian aviator (b. 1903)

September

 September 1 – Dennis Brain, English French horn player (b. 1921) (car crash)
 September 2 – Bobby Myers, American NASCAR driver (b. 1927)
 September 9 – Muhammad al-Muqri, grand vizier of Morocco (b. 1844)
 September 15 – Lee Hill, American actor (b. 1894)
 September 16 – Qi Baishi, Chinese painter (b. 1864)
 September 20 – Jean Sibelius, Finnish composer (b. 1865)
 September 21 
Jimmy Callahan, American actor (b. 1891)
 Norma Giménez, Argentine actress (b. 1930)
 Margaret Ashmore Sudduth, American educator, editor, temperance advocate (b. 1859)
 King Haakon VII of Norway (b. 1872)
 September 22 – Toyoda Soemu, Japanese admiral (b. 1885)
 September 25 – Archduke Joseph Ferdinand of Austria (b. 1895)
 September 28 – Luis Cluzeau Mortet, Uruguayan composer and musician (b. 1888)
 September 29 – Prince George Bagration, Georgian nobleman (b. 1884)

October

 October 3 
 Bernard Maybeck, American Arts and Crafts architect (b. 1862)
 Lőrinc Szabó, Hungarian poet (b. 1900)
 October 9 – Hassiba Ben Bouali, Algerian militant (b. 1938)
 October 19 – V. Gordon Childe, Australian archaeologist (b. 1892)
 October 20 – Jack Buchanan, British actor (b. 1891)
 October 23 – Frederick Burton, American actor (b. 1871)
 October 24
 Christian Dior, French fashion designer (b. 1905)
 Jacobus Hendrik Pierneef, South African artist (b. 1886)
 October 25
 Albert Anastasia, American gangster (b. 1902)
 Lord Dunsany, Irish author (b. 1878)
 October 26 
 Gerty Cori, Austrian-born biochemist, recipient of the Nobel Prize in Physiology or Medicine (b. 1896)
 Nikos Kazantzakis, Greek writer (b. 1883)
 October 27 – Giovanni Battista Caproni, Italian aeronautical, civil and electrical engineer, aircraft designer and industrialist (b. 1886)
 October 29 – Louis B. Mayer, American film studio mogul, former head of Metro-Goldwyn-Mayer (MGM) (b. 1885)
 October 30 – José Patricio Guggiari, Paraguayan politician, 32nd President of Paraguay (b. 1884)
 October 31 – Helena Willman-Grabowska, Polish indologist, Sorbonne and Jagiellonian University professor (b. 1870)

November

 November 2 
 William Haywood, British architect (b. 1876)
 Ted Meredith, American Olympic athlete (b. 1891)
 November 3
 Charles Brabin, American director and screenwriter (b. 1882)
 Laika, Soviet space dog (b. c. 1954)
 Wilhelm Reich, Austrian psychoanalyst (b. 1897)
 November 4
 Joseph Canteloube, French composer and singer (b. 1879)
 Shoghi Effendi, Bahá'í leader (b. 1897)
 Grigore Preoteasa, Romanian activist (b. 1915)
 November 7
 Dina Romano, Italian stage and film actress (b. 1888)
 Hasui Kawase, Japanese painter and printmaker (b. 1883)
 November 11 – Masao Maruyama, Japanese general (b. 1889)
 November 13 – Antonín Zápotocký, 6th President and 15th Prime Minister of Czechoslovakia (b. 1884)
 November 15 – Andrzej Bursa, Polish poet (b. 1932)
 November 17 – Cora Witherspoon, American actress (b. 1890)
 November 18 – Rudolf Diels, German Nazi civil servant and Gestapo chief (b. 1900)
 November 24 – Diego Rivera, Mexican painter (b. 1886)
 November 25
 Prince George of Greece and Denmark, high commissioner of the Cretan State (b. 1869)
 Raymond Griffith, American actor (b. 1895)
 William V. Pratt, American admiral (b. 1869)
 November 26
 Billy Bevan, Australian actor (b. 1887)
 Petros Voulgaris, Prime Minister of Greece (b. 1884)
 November 29 – Erich Wolfgang Korngold, Austrian composer (b. 1897)
 November 30 – Beniamino Gigli, Italian tenor (b. 1890)

December

 December 2 – Harrison Ford, American silent film actor (b. 1884)
 December 4 – Sir John Lavarack, Australian general, Governor of Queensland (b. 1885)
 December 6 
 Claude Barnard, Australian politician and government minister (b. 1890)
 Robert Esnault-Pelterie, French aircraft designer and pioneer rocket theorist (b. 1881)
 December 8
Petre Antonescu, Romanian general (b. 1891)
Reginald Sheffield, English actor (b. 1901)
 December 10 – Maurice McLoughlin, American tennis champion (b. 1890)
 December 10
 James Stevenson-Hamilton, first warden of South Africa's Kruger National Park (b. 1867)
 Napoleon Zervas, Greek WW II Resistance leader (b. 1891)
 December 11 – Musidora, French actress (b. 1889)
 December 15 – Alfonso Bedoya, Mexican actor (b. 1904)
 December 17 – Dorothy L. Sayers, British crime writer, poet, playwright and essayist (b. 1893)
 December 21 – Eric Coates, English composer (b. 1886)
 December 24 – Norma Talmadge, American actress (b. 1894)
 December 25
 Alfred Walton Hinds, 17th Naval Governor of Guam (b. 1874)
 Charles Pathé, French film pioneer (b. 1863)
 December 26 – Angelo Motta, Italian entrepreneur (b. 1890)
 December 28 – Hilda Vaughn, American actress (b. 1898)
 December 31 – Óscar Domínguez, Spanish painter (b. 1906)

Nobel Prizes

 Physics – Chen-Ning Yang, Tsung-Dao Lee
 Chemistry – Lord Alexander R. Todd
 Physiology or Medicine – Daniel Bovet
 Literature – Albert Camus
 Peace – Lester Bowles Pearson

References